La Toya Jackson is the 1980 debut album from American singer-songwriter La Toya Jackson. It was released in America and mainland Europe. The album is most known for "Night Time Lover", a track produced by La Toya's brother Michael Jackson, who provides background vocals on the refrain. The album peaked at #116 on the Billboard 200, #26 on the Billboard Top Black Albums chart, and #178 in the UK. It spawned two singles: "If You Feel the Funk" and "Night Time Lover".

Album information
In order to distinguish herself from her famous brothers, The Jacksons, La Toya only wanted her first name on the album. "I begged just to have it 'La Toya'. But my father said, 'It's your last name. You got to use it.' But I wanted to see what I could do as an individual." The album was re-issued on CD in Japan in 1992. A successful petition was gathered by her fans at ChurchofLaToya.com to persuade the label, Cherry Pop, to re-release her debut album on CD for the first time in the UK. It was re-released on May 22, 2006.

Reception

In its review, The Evening Independent said that Jackson has "an attractive, pleasant voice that is mature and controlled." Allmusic said Jackson "has an obvious enthusiasm for the songs that comes through consistently. That factor, along with the strong cast of musicians and some memorable tunes, makes this an overall enjoyable set."

"If You Feel the Funk" performed modestly on the charts, narrowly missing out on the Billboard Hot 100 at #101. However, it peaked at #17 on the Billboard Dance/Club Play chart and #40 on the Billboard R&B chart. It also reached #42 in Germany and #18 in the Netherlands. "If You Feel the Funk" was also released as a 12" single in the United Kingdom where it failed to chart. The follow-up single, "Night Time Lover" failed to generate attention, despite brother Michael singing on the track (who was at the time generating critical and public acclaim for his album Off the Wall). It peaked at #59 on the Billboard R&B chart.

Track listing

Personnel
 La Toya Jackson - lead vocals
 Michael Jackson - co-lead vocals
 Darren Carmichael, Bill Champlin, Lynn Davis, Marva Holcolm, Josie James, Deborah Thomas, Arnell Carmichael - backing vocals
 Freddie "Ready Freddie" Washington, Nathan Watts, Rick Chudacoff, Kevin Brandon - bass
 Ollie E. Brown, James Gadson, Jeff Porcaro, Dorie Pride, Eddie "Bongo" Brown, Paulinho da Costa - drums, percussion
 David E. Williams, Greg Poree, Ray Parker Jr., Paul Jackson, Jr., Jay Graydon, Marlo Henderson - guitar
 Arnell Carmichael - hand clapping
 Stevie Wonder - harmonica
 George Bohanon, Oscar Brashear, Michael Davis, Mic Gillette, Gary Herbig, Alan Kaplan, John Kelson Jr., Doc Kupka, Arthur Maebe, Ollie Mitchell, Don Myrick, Billy Page, Lenny Pickett, Louis Satterfield, Henry Sigismonti, Maurice Spears, Tom Washington - horns
 Gene Page - string and horn arrangements
 Kim Bullard, Clarence McDonald, Sylvester Rivers, Patrice Rushen - keyboards

References

1980 debut albums
La Toya Jackson albums
Polydor Records albums
Albums arranged by Gene Page
Albums produced by Michael Jackson
Disco albums by American artists